The Rhode Island Federation of Teachers and Health Professionals (RIFTHP) is a statewide federation of labor unions in the state of Rhode Island in the United States. The federation's local unions represent teachers and other educational workers, state and municipal employees, health care workers in the public and private sector, and higher education faculty and workers in the public and private sector. It is an affiliate of the American Federation of Teachers (AFT) and the AFL–CIO.

In 2021, the federation's president was Francis J. Flynn.

History
The Rhode Island Federation of Teachers was founded as the Rhode Island Branch, American Federation of Teachers, on March 27, 1947. The original unions making up the federation were the Warwick Teachers' Union, the North Providence Federation of Teachers, the Pawtucket Teachers' Alliance, the Woonsocket Teachers' Guild, and the Providence Teachers' Alliance. Four years after its formation, the Pawtucket Teachers' Alliance went out on strike—one of a handful of local unions to disobey a national AFT policy banning strikes by teachers. The federation changed its name to the Rhode Island Federation of Teachers in 1958. The Pawtucket strike ended in a settlement favorable to the union, and a rudimentary contract—one of the first teacher contracts in the United States. Another strike in Pawtucket in 1964 also ended in a contract, this one personally negotiated by Governor John Chafee. This collective bargaining experience helped pave the way for legalization of teacher unionism in Rhode Island two years later.

Public school teachers in Rhode Island were given the legal right to bargain collectively over "...hours, salary, working conditions, and other terms of professional employment" in May 1966 (P.L. 1966, Chapter 146). Rhode Island law also allows payment of unemployment benefits to public school workers if they struck for more than eight weeks.

Edward J. McElroy was president of RIFTHP from 1969 to 1992. He was elected Secretary-Treasurer of the AFT in 1992, and President in 2004 (he retired in 2008).

In 1971, David Selden, then a national representative with the AFT, attempted to convince the leaders of RIFTHP to join with the state federations in Connecticut and New York to fund and operate an organizing project, but the RIFTHP leaders rejected the idea.

In the early 1970s, RIFTHP and the NEA statewide affiliate in Rhode Island considered merging, but did not do so. During the same years, RIFTHP was active in organizing higher education faculty as well. When the AFT and the National Education Association signed a tentative merger agreement in 1998, RIFTHP leaders refused to immediately commit to a state-level merger (but supported the national effort).

RIFTHP began organizing nurses in the late 1970s and early 1980s.  Its most significant effort in this area came when it organized more than 1,000 registered nurses at Rhode Island Hospital in August 1993. But in 1998, more than 3,500 health care workers belonging to RIFTHP disaffiliated in a dispute over how much money should be spent on organizing new members. Although RIFTHP and the AFT disputed the election results and sued former staff who went to work for the new union (the United Nurses and Allied Professionals), the AFT lost these challenges.

Activities
The Rhode Island Federation of Teachers and Health Professionals is considered one of the most active political groups in the state of Rhode Island. It sued to oppose the shut-down of Rhode Island state government during a budget crisis in 1991, fought to keep full-time union leaders (who were former public employees) in the state pension system, worked to enact strong constraints on charter schools in the state's charter school law (the resulting law is one of the most restrictive in the nation as of 2004), supported stronger and clearer curriculum standards, sued to stop the state from penalizing retired public employees who were enrolled in more expensive health care plans, opposed binding arbitration for teacher union contracts, opposed merit pay, fought reductions in retiree pensions, and sought to limit the role of school-wide committees in establishing teacher assignments, class sizes and layoff rules.

A significant network of unionized teachers interested in applying new union structures and models to creating high-quality schools, part of the Teacher Union Reform Network (TURN), is also active within RIFTHP. There have been some media reports that this network has had an influence on RIFTHP, and that the state federation is more willing to embrace some union and school reform efforts. In 2006, RIFTHP and the NEA affiliate in Rhode Island issued a joint report which focused on poverty and its many negative effects on children (such a malnutrition, unstable or violent home situations, lack of access to books and educational items like crayons or paper, and little access to high-quality early childhood programs) as key issues in the school reform effort. The report dismissed criticism that collective bargaining agreements stymied reform, and pressed for higher spending on early-childhood programs, reductions in class size, and improving teacher training programs. In 2009, the state federation began a push to have local school boards adopt much more rigorous teacher evaluation standards as well as stronger mentoring program. The state of Rhode Island approved the plan for adoption by local school boards, and RIFTHP won a $200,000 national competitive grant to help fund the first four programs (to be implemented in Central Falls, Cranston, Pawtucket, Providence, West Warwick, and Woonsocket).

Publications
The RIFTHP issues one publication, the Smith Hill Report. The Smith Hill Report is published weekly while the Rhode Island General Assembly is in session. It is available on RIFTHP's Web site.

References

External links
RIFTHP Web site

American Federation of Teachers
Education trade unions
Healthcare trade unions in the United States
Trade unions in Rhode Island
Public sector trade unions
Trade unions established in 1947
Education in Rhode Island
1947 establishments in Rhode Island
State wide trade unions in the United States
Medical and health organizations based in Rhode Island